Omar Hawsawi (Arabic: عمر هوساوي; born on 27 September 1985) is a Saudi Arabian footballer who currently plays for Al-Ittihad. He also represented the Saudi Arabia national team and earned 53 caps between 2013 and 2019. He also participated in the 2018 FIFA World Cup and the 2015 and 2019 editions of the AFC Asian Cup.

Club career

Early career
Hawsawi used to be a part of Al-Shabab's youth setup though he was released before he could make his debut for the first team. After he was released by Al-Shabab, Hawsawi joined Al-Washm. He spent a year at Al-Washm before joining Al-Shoulla.

Al-Shoulla
His first match was against Al-Faisaly, but after one year he left. He played his last match against Al-Jeel.

Al-Nassr
On 13 October 2010, Hawsawi signed a pre-contract agreement with Al-Nassr and joined the club during the 2011 winter transfer window. He made his debut for the first team on 24 February 2011 during the 3–2 win over Al-Faisaly. In 2013−14 season, he made 22 league appearances as he helped Al-Nassr win the Saudi League and the Crown Prince Cup. On 15 January 2014, Hawsawi renewed his contract with Al-Nassr for 4 years. In 2014−15 season, he won the League again. On 4 April 2017, Al-Nassr Club announced that the medical tests of the defender Omar Hawsawi showed that he suffered a slight knee injury and needed rest and treatment for five days, after the match against Al-Hilal in the quarter-finals of The Custodian of the Two Holy Mosques Cup. On 28 January 2018, Hawsawi renewed his contract with Al-Nassr once again. In the 2018–19 season, Hawsawi captained Al-Nassr to their first league title in 4 years and their 8th league title overall.

International career
In May 2018 he was named in Saudi Arabia's preliminary squad for the 2018 FIFA World Cup in Russia. On October 3, 2019, Omar Hawsawi announced through his official Twitter account that he would be retiring internationally. He was on the Saudi Arabia national team in 3 major tournaments, the 2015 and 2019 AFC Asian Cup and the 2018 FIFA World Cup.

Career statistics

Club

International
Statistics accurate as of match played 10 September 2019.

International goals
Scores and results list Saudi Arabia's goal tally first.

Honours
Al-Nassr
 Saudi Professional League: 2013–14, 2014–15, 2018–19
 Saudi Crown Prince Cup: 2013–14
 Saudi Super Cup: 2019

Al-Ittihad
 Saudi Super Cup: 2022

References

External links
asia.eurosport.com Profile

slstat.com Profile

1985 births
Living people
Sportspeople from Mecca
Saudi Arabian footballers
Association football defenders
Saudi Fourth Division players
Saudi First Division League players
Saudi Professional League players
Al-Shabab FC (Riyadh) players
Al-Washm Club players
Al-Shoulla FC players
Al Nassr FC players
Ittihad FC players
Saudi Arabia international footballers
2015 AFC Asian Cup players
2019 AFC Asian Cup players
2018 FIFA World Cup players